Giorgio may refer to:

 Castel Giorgio, comune in Umbria, Italy
 Giorgio (name), an Italian given name and surname
 Giorgio Moroder, or Giorgio, Italian record producer
 Giorgio (album), an album by Giorgio Moroder
 "Giorgio" (song), a song by Lys Assia
 Giorgio Bruno, a character from the video game Time Crisis 4
 Giorgio Zott, the main antagonist from the video game Time Crisis 3
 Giorgio Beverly Hills, a prestige fragrance brand

See also
 Georgios
 Georgio (disambiguation)
 San Giorgio (disambiguation)